= Kengere =

- Directed by: Tukei Peter
- Screenplay by: Tukei Peter
- Produced by: Rural Area
- Cinematography: Tukei Peter
- Edited by: Sunna Peter
- Music by: Sunna Peter
- Release date: 2010
- Running time: 23 minutes
- Country: Uganda

Kengere is a 2010 Ugandan documentary film.

== Synopsis ==
In 1989, Ugandan Army soldiers accused 69 people of being rebels and locked them in train wagons, then set fire to them. Kengere tells the story of a cyclist who returns to his home village in search of a tape that contains evidence of the crime.
